David Škoch and Tomáš Zíb were the defending champions, but did not participate together this year.  Skoch partnered Jordan Kerr, losing in the first round.  Zib did not participate this year.

Wesley Moodie and Todd Perry won in the final 7–5, 7–5, against Yves Allegro and Sebastián Prieto.

Seeds

Draw

Draw

External links
Draw

Doubles